RSC Advances is an online-only peer-reviewed scientific journal covering research on all aspects of the chemical sciences. It was established in 2011 and is published by the Royal Society of Chemistry. The editor-in-chief is Russell J. Cox (Leibniz University Hannover).

In 2014, the journal moved to a very high publication frequency, initially about 100/year (similar to that of ChemComm), but later in the year (and in 2015) turned to even higher frequency—however it did not become a continuous journal. The number of pages published annually had increased dramatically from about 26,500 in 2013 to over 65,000 in 2014, culminating at 116 issues and 115,000+ pages (~1000 pages per issue) in 2016.

In late 2016, it was announced that with effect from January 2017, the journal would convert from a subscription based journal to an open access journal. Meanwhile, the journal experienced a cool-down in publication volume, with each issue having only ~500 pages. There were 89 issues in 2017 and 74 issues in 2018.

Abstracting and indexing 
The journal is abstracted and indexed in the Science Citation Index Expanded, Current Contents/Physical, Chemical & Earth Sciences, and Scopus.

References

External links 
 

Royal Society of Chemistry academic journals
Publications established in 2011
Chemistry journals
English-language journals
Journals more frequent than weekly
Irregular journals
Online-only journals